Thomas Sherwin (July 11, 1839 – December 19, 1914) was an American Civil War general and executive. He was the son of educator Thomas Sherwin, master of the English High School of Boston. The younger Sherwin taught in Dedham, Massachusetts before the war. He enlisted in the 22nd Massachusetts Volunteer Infantry in 1861 as a lieutenant.

He was wounded at the Battle of Gaines' Mill on June 27, 1862. On April 3, 1866, President Andrew Johnson nominated Sherwin for the award of the honorary grade of brevet brigadier general, United States Volunteers, to rank from March 13, 1865, for distinguished gallantry at the Battle of Gettysburg and for gallant and meritorious services during the war, The U.S. Senate confirmed the award on May 18, 1866.

See also

List of Massachusetts generals in the American Civil War
Massachusetts in the American Civil War
Dedham, Massachusetts in the American Civil War

References

Works cited

Union Army generals
1839 births
1914 deaths
Military personnel from Dedham, Massachusetts
People of Massachusetts in the American Civil War